Qushijeh (also Romanized as Qūshījeh; also known as Qūshjeh) is a village in Mofatteh Rural District, in the Central District of Famenin County, Hamadan Province, Iran. At the 2006 census, its population was 107, in 26 families.

References 

Populated places in Famenin County